Reflexe is a Czech academic journal containing original research, systematic reviews, and translations relating to the fields of philosophy and theology. It has been established by Ladislav Hejdánek. During the period of 1985–89 the journal was printed and distributed in the samizdat form. Reflexe has been published officially since 1990. The journal appears two times a year with Tomáš Koblížek as editor-in-chief.

See also 
 List of philosophy journals

External links
  
 The Czech Philosophical Journals 
 Publishing house "Οικουμενη"

Philosophy journals
Biannual journals
Hybrid open access journals
Czech-language journals
Czech philosophy
Publications established in 1985
1985 establishments in Czechoslovakia